The 1999 Sanex Trophy was a women's tennis tournament played on outdoor clay courts in Knokke-Heist, Belgium that was part of the Tier IVa category of the 1999 WTA Tour. It was the inaugural edition of the tournament and was held from 2 August until 8 August 1999. Fourth-seeded María Sánchez Lorenzo won the singles title and earned $16,000 first-prize money.

Entrants

Seeds

Other entrants
The following players received wildcards into the singles main draw:
  Michelle Gerards
  Marta Marrero

The following players received wildcards into the doubles main draw:
  Kim Clijsters /  Justine Henin

The following players received entry from the singles qualifying draw:

  Angelika Bachmann
  Mariam Ramon Climent
  Anastasia Myskina
  Antonella Serra Zanetti

The following players received entry from the doubles qualifying draw:

  Petra Begerow /  Antonella Serra Zanetti
  Hannah Collin /  Marta Marrero

Finals

Singles

 María Sánchez Lorenzo defeated  Denisa Chládková, 6–7(2–7), 6–4, 6–2
 This was Sánchez Lorenzo's only WTA title.

Doubles

 Eva Martincová /  Elena Wagner defeated  Evgenia Koulikovskaya /  Sandra Naćuk, 3–6, 6–3, 6–3

References

External links
 ITF tournament edition details
 Tournament draws

Sanex Trophy
WTA Knokke-Heist
1999 in Belgian tennis